Challenges is a 2011 Sri Lankan Sinhala romantic comedy film directed by Udayakantha Warnasuriya and co-produced by Ranjith Jayasuriya, Pravin Jayaratne, Ajith Priyantha and Udayakantha Warnasuriya for Sunflower Films. It stars Sheshadri Priyasad, Pubudu Chathuranga and Roshan Ranawana in lead roles along with Lucky Dias and Vasanthi Chathurani. Music composed by Sai Gurunath. It is the 1154th Sri Lankan film in the Sinhala cinema.

It became the first Sri Lankan box office hit of 2011. Challenges was released on 11 March 2011 nationally and premiered at the Savoy Theatre, Wellawatte on 10 March in a celebrity premiere screening. The film has been shot in Colombo, Nuwara Eliya, Colombo and Nilaveli areas. A website www.challengesmovie.com was launched in October 2010.

Plot

The story of revolves around Ranuk Randunu whose father is Professor Esala Randunu. In childhood itself Ranuk is taught to take responsibilities and to be a disciplined citizen. Grooming to be a handsome youth, Ranuk falls in love with Sharanya who is a beautiful girl. Yet there is a challenge for Ranuk in the way of her own cousin Kishan. A love triangle forms and Ranuk realises that life’s challenges are much harder than just winning the heart of his love.

Cast
Sheshadri Priyasad as Sharanya
Pubudu Chathuranga as Ranuk Randunu
Roshan Ranawana as Kishan
Lucky Dias as Esala Randunu, Ranuk's father
Vasanthi Chathurani as Ranuk's mother
Sangeetha Weeraratne as Gayesha, competition organizer
Janaki Wijerathna as Judge
Oshini Liyanage as Sharanya's friend
Dilshani Perera as Senuli
Sarath Chandrasiri as Bag thief

Soundtrack
The songs were composed by Sai Gurunath. The song "Eka Fantasy Heeneka" is based on "Appudo Ippudo" from Bommarillu (2006).

References

2010s Sinhala-language films
2011 films
2011 romantic comedy films
Sri Lankan romantic comedy films
Films directed by Udayakantha Warnasuriya